The following is a list of MTV Pilipinas winners for Favorite Group Video.

References

MTV Pilipinas Music Awards